Henry Gustavo Pease García, known as Henry Pease, (11 December 1944 – 9 August 2014) was a Peruvian politician and a former Congressman. He ran for President under the United Left in the 1990 general elections but placed fourth with 8.2% of the popular vote and failed to qualify for the run-off.

Biography 
Pease was born on 11 December 1944 in Lima. He ran for President under the United Left in the 1990 general elections but placed fourth with 8.2% of the popular vote and failed to qualify for the run-off which was eventually won by Alberto Fujimori. Two years later, he was elected as a Congressman in the Democratic Constituent Congress and three years later in 1995 in the Congress of the Republic and served until 2006.  In the general elections of 2000, he was a candidate for the 1st Vice Presidency on the presidential roster of Máximo San Román for Union for Peru, however, said roster did not pass to the runoff and Pease was only re-elected Congressman for the parliamentary period 2000-2005.

He participated in the March of the Four Suyos where he was an opponent of the dictatorship of Alberto Fujimori and in November of the same year, he was elected Second Vice President of Congress on the Board of Directors chaired by Valentín Paniagua (2000), who later became Temporary President. After the fall of the Fujimori regime in November 2000, his parliamentary position was reduced until 2001 when new general elections were called. While he was serving in the Democratic Constituent Congress, he was a member of the Democratic Left Movement. He served as the President of the Congress for a year between 2003 and 2004. He tried to run for Congress again in the 2011 general elections, under the Possible Peru Alliance, representing Lima, but he was not elected as he attained a low number of votes and retired from politics.

Death 
He died on 9 August 2014 in Lima at the age of 69.

Personal life 
Pease was characterized by being one of the most illustrious and loyal politicians in Peru. This is evidenced when, at the time of terror and the self-coup carried out by the Fujimori regime, Congressman Pease directly faced authoritarianism and dictatorship. The defense of democracy and the rule of law have been a constant without deviation in his life. Despite receiving threats, Pease was undaunted by the fear.

He always showed a considerably broader perspective than many of his colleagues, an argument for this, is the proposal that he offers to the political class, at the time of the Shining Path, so that it is the Police Service that takes charge of this lineage of the society as had been successfully achieved in European countries, but said political class did not accept. However, in 1992, it was the GEIN (Special Group of National Police Intelligence) that captured three-quarters of the top leadership of the terrorist group.

He was close friends with characters like María Elena Moyano, who was a leader of the Villa el Salvador district; of Valentín Paniagua, who was the Transitory President of Peru in 2000, an anecdote aside, was elected by representatives of all the parties representing Pease's home; by Alfonso Barrantes, of whom he was Lieutenant Mayor in 1983. Pease is one of the most respected and beloved political figures of the time, among other things, for his undoubted loyalty and honesty to ethics and the country.

Among his most heroic acts is the March for Peace, which he led in 1989 when he was already a candidate for the presidency. This march was held on November 3 of that year as a response to an announcement by the Shining Path terrorist group, which called the country to panic the same day. However, thanks to the political movement inspired by Pease and supported by all the other political parties, including Mario Vargas Llosa, the largest and most numerous march in the history of Peru was held. This was later repeated in all the capitals of the country as a symbol of a united and courageous Peru against the fear of the Shining Path.

See also
 Alfonso Barrantes Lingán

References

External links
IFES Election Guide - Election Profile for Peru

1944 births
2014 deaths
People from Lima
Presidents of the Congress of the Republic of Peru
Peruvian sociologists
Possible Peru politicians
Union for Peru politicians
Peruvian people of Spanish descent
Peruvian people of British descent 
Members of the Democratic Constituent Congress
Members of the Congress of the Republic of Peru

Pontifical Catholic University of Peru alumni